107–123 Muswell Hill Road is a grade II listed parade of shops in Muswell Hill Road, Muswell Hill, London.

The building adjoins the grade II* listed Everyman Cinema, formerly the Odeon Cinema, at its north end.

References

External links

Grade II listed buildings in the London Borough of Haringey
Muswell Hill